Below is the list of ambassadors from Guinea to the United States:

 Diallo Telli (1959–61)
 Conté Seydou (1961–68)
 Karim Bangoura (1969–71)
 Keita Mory (1971–72)
 Touré Sadam Moussa (1972–74)
 Bah Habib (1974–76)
 Kouroma Daouda (1977)
 Camara Ibrahima (1977–79)
 Condé Mohamed Laminé (1979–83)
 Diallo Thierno Habib (1983–84)
 Beavogui Tollo (1984–88)
 Camara Kékoura (1988–90)
 Sangaré Moussa (1990–93)
 Barry Boubacar (1993–96)
 Thiam Mohamed Aly (1996–2001)
 Barry Rafiou Alpha Oumar (2002-)

References

 
United States of America, Ambassadors from Guinea to
Guinea
es:Anexo:Embajadores de Guinea en los Estados Unidos